All Japan Badminton Championships is a tournament organized to crown the best badminton players in Japan.

Past winners

References

External links
 Kyōto-fu Badminton Kyōkai: Champions 1947–2004
 Japan National Team: Nippon Badminton Association

Badminton tournaments in Japan
National badminton championships
Recurring sporting events established in 1947